The 2014–15 Toledo Rockets Huskies men's basketball team represented the University of Toledo during the 2014–15 NCAA Division I men's basketball season. The Rockets, led by fifth year head coach Tod Kowalczyk, played their home games at Savage Arena, as members of the West Division of the Mid-American Conference. They finished the season 20–13, 11–7 in MAC play to finish in second place in the West Division. They advanced to the semifinals of the MAC tournament where they lost to Central Michigan. Despite having 20 wins, they were not invited to a postseason tournament.

Roster

Schedule
Source: 

|-
!colspan=9 style="background:#000080; color:#F9D819;"| Exhibition

|-
!colspan=9 style="background:#000080; color:#F9D819;"| Regular season

|-
!colspan=9 style="background:#000080; color:#F9D819;"| MAC tournament

References

Toledo
Toledo Rockets men's basketball seasons